Varick may refer to:

Places
 Varick, New York
 Varick Street

People
 Varick, a prominent Dutch family in the colony of New York
 James Varick (1750–1827), freed slave of the Varicks, American bishop
 Richard Varick (1753–1831), American revolutionary and politician

Other uses
 Varick Enterprises, a strongarm collection agency for the public loading racket on the piers, run by Eddie McGrath and George Daggert, enforced by McGrath's brother-in-law John M. Dunn, and employing Robert Barney Baker as a collector